A2G is an EP by American hip hop duo Blackalicious. It was originally released on Quannum Projects in 1999. It peaked at number 21 on the UK Independent Albums Chart.

The EP contains the tongue-twisting song "Alphabet Aerobics", which actor Daniel Radcliffe recited on The Tonight Show Starring Jimmy Fallon in 2014.

Critical reception

Stanton Swihart of AllMusic gave the EP 4 stars out of 5, describing "Alphabet Aerobics" as "an impressive concert staple and showcase for the constantly brilliant Gift of Gab, one of the very finest MCs to ever pick up a microphone."

Track listing

Charts

References

External links
 
 

1999 EPs
Hip hop EPs
Blackalicious albums
Quannum Projects EPs